Holotrichia danielssoni is a species of dung beetle found in Sri Lanka.

Description
Average length is about 18 to 21 mm. The male body is elongate and reddish brown in color. The head, pronotum and legs are much darker. The abdomen is shiny and yellow-brown. The head is short and transverse. The clypeus is short, shiny, and coarsely punctated. Its eyes are large. The antennae are divided into 10 segments and show a tendency to fusion of segments. The pronotum is moderately transverse. The scutellum is moderate with rounded napes with and punctures only laterally. The elytra is long with 3 distinct ribs and a pronounced humeral callus. The pygidium is convex and narrowly bordered. Its legs arevlong and tarsi without punctures. The fore tibiae are tridentate, with an apical thorn. Female elytra are more shiny.

References

Melolonthinae
Insects of Sri Lanka
Insects described in 1995